Paul Edward Postma (born February 22, 1989) is a Canadian professional ice hockey defenceman who is currently playing for EC KAC of the ICE Hockey League (ICEHL). He was drafted 205th overall in the 2007 NHL Entry Draft by the Atlanta Thrashers. During his major junior career with the Swift Current Broncos and Calgary Hitmen of the Western Hockey League (WHL), Postma won the WHL Plus-Minus Award and was a WHL East First Team All-Star in 2009.

Playing career
Postma has played major junior in the WHL for the Swift Current Broncos and Calgary Hitmen. After a 24-point season in 2006–07, he was drafted in the 7th round, 205th overall, by the Atlanta Thrashers in the 2007 NHL Entry Draft. The next season, he was traded to the Calgary Hitmen, where he recorded 14 goals and 42 points. In 2008–09, Postma emerged with a 23-goal, 84-point campaign, first among league defencemen, setting team records for single-season goals (surpassed Kenton Smith's 19 goals in 1998–99) and points (tied with Matt Kinch) by a defenceman.

He earned WHL East First Team All-Star honours, along with teammates Brandon Kozun and Brett Sonne and a nomination for the Bill Hunter Memorial Trophy as the league's top defenceman, opposite Jonathon Blum of the Vancouver Giants. With a league-high +67 plus-minus rating, he won the WHL Plus-Minus Award. During the second round of the subsequent 2009 playoffs, Postma was signed to a three-year, entry-level contract by the Thrashers. He finished the 2009 playoffs with 13 points in 18 games, as the Hitmen were defeated in the finals by the Kelowna Rockets.

While playing for the Winnipeg Jets, Postma scored his first NHL goal on February 1, 2013, against Anders Lindbäck of the Tampa Bay Lightning. In 2013–14, Postma missed most of the season due to injury, including a blood clot that had him sidelined for 47 games. Postma played a total of 42 games for the Jets during the 2014–15 season, but was sidelined in March, due to a lower-body injury.

On July 10, 2015, Postma signed a two-year, $1,775,000 contract extension with the Jets.

After spending his first eight professional seasons with the Thrashers/Jets franchise, Postma left as a free agent in agreeing to terms with the Boston Bruins on a one-year, $775,000 contract on July 1, 2017. He split the 2017–18 season between Boston and AHL affiliate, the Providence Bruins.

As a free agent from the Bruins, Postma opted to halt his North American career, agreeing to a one-year contract with Russian champions, Ak Bars Kazan of the Kontinental Hockey League (KHL), on August 15, 2018. In the 2018–19 season, Postma regained his scoring touch in the KHL, posting 8 goals and 28 points through 57 regular season games.

On May 1, 2019, Postma left Ak Bars as a free agent to sign a one-year contract with Russian outfit, Metallurg Magnitogorsk. He made just 10 appearances with Magnitogorsk to open the 2019–20 season before opting to leave the KHL on October 6, 2019. Moving to continue his career in Switzerland, after a successful tryout, Postma joined HC Lugano of the National League (NL) on a one-year deal on November 6, 2019.

On December 8, 2020, Postma belatedly joined Austrian club, EC KAC of the ICEHL, as a free agent on an initial one-year contract.

Personal life
Postma attended Gateway Christian School and Notre Dame High School in Red Deer, Alberta. He is the son of John and Janet Postma and has three sisters; Alissa, Jamie-Lea and Sharlene. Alissa is married to former NHL defenceman Noah Welch. while his other sister, Sharlene is married to American ice hockey player Rhett Rakhshani.

Records
 Calgary Hitmen team record; single-season points by a defenceman - 84 in 2008–09 (tied with Matt Kinch - 2000–01)

Career statistics

Awards and honours

References

External links

1989 births
Living people
Ak Bars Kazan players
Atlanta Thrashers draft picks
Atlanta Thrashers players
Boston Bruins players
Calgary Hitmen players
Canadian ice hockey defencemen
Canadian people of Dutch descent
Chicago Wolves players
Ice hockey people from Alberta
EC KAC players
HC Lugano players
Manitoba Moose players
Metallurg Magnitogorsk players
Providence Bruins players
Sportspeople from Red Deer, Alberta
St. John's IceCaps players
Swift Current Broncos players
Winnipeg Jets players